Taphoxenus is a genus of ground beetles in the family Carabidae. There are about 14 described species in Taphoxenus.

Species
These 14 species belong to the genus Taphoxenus:

 Taphoxenus alatavicus Semenov, 1908  (Kazakhstan and Kyrgyzstan)
 Taphoxenus cellarum (M.Adams, 1817)  (worldwide)
 Taphoxenus cerberus (Ganglbauer, 1905)  (Turkey)
 Taphoxenus elburzensis Casale & Wrase, 2018  (Iran)
 Taphoxenus gigas (Fischer von Waldheim, 1823)  (worldwide)
 Taphoxenus goliath (Faldermann, 1836)  (worldwide)
 Taphoxenus hauserianus Casale, 1988  (China)
 Taphoxenus meridionalis Casale, 1982  (Iraq and Syria)
 Taphoxenus murzini Casale & Wrase, 2018  (Iran)
 Taphoxenus persicus Jedlicka, 1952  (Iran)
 Taphoxenus pseudogracilis Vereschagina, 1987
 Taphoxenus transmontanus Semenov, 1908  (China and Kyrgyzstan)
 Taphoxenus trochanteratus Emden, 1954  (Afghanistan)
 Taphoxenus ziegleri Casale & Assmann, 2017  (Jordan)

References

Platyninae